Fernando Horacio Ávalos (born 31 March 1978) is an Argentine former footballer who played as a central defender.

He spent most of his professional career in Portugal, amassing Primeira Liga totals of 187 matches and three goals over the course of eight seasons, mainly in representation of Nacional (four years). He also had spells in five other countries, his own notwithstanding.

Club career
Born in Posadas, Misiones Province, Ávalos started his professional career with Club Atlético Nueva Chicago then moved, in his country, to Club Atlético Huracán and Club Social, Deportivo y Cultural Español. His first abroad experience arrived in 2000, with Brazil's Sport Club Corinthians Paulista.

After splitting the 2000–01 season with Corinthians and FC Basel, Ávalos found stability in the Portuguese Primeira Liga, playing two years with Boavista F.C. and four and a half at Madeira's C.D. Nacional. He appeared in two UEFA Cup editions with the latter.

In January 2008, Ávalos moved to Germany with MSV Duisburg, not being able to help his new team prevent relegation from the Bundesliga. Released in December he returned to Portugal to sign with C.F. Os Belenenses, where he met the same fate; at the end of the campaign he moved to Cyprus, with Nea Salamis Famagusta FC.

Aged 32, Ávalos returned to Portugal and the Madeira island, signing with lowly A.D. Camacha. For 2011–12 he stayed in the region, joining second level's C.F. União and being a defensive stalwart for several years.

In January 2014, Ávalos moved clubs and countries again, penning a one-year contract with Angola's F.C. Bravos do Maquis.

References

External links

1978 births
Living people
People from Posadas, Misiones
Argentine footballers
Association football defenders
Argentine Primera División players
Primera Nacional players
Nueva Chicago footballers
Club Atlético Huracán footballers
Deportivo Español footballers
Campeonato Brasileiro Série A players
Sport Club Corinthians Paulista players
FC Basel players
Primeira Liga players
Liga Portugal 2 players
Segunda Divisão players
Boavista F.C. players
C.D. Nacional players
C.F. Os Belenenses players
C.F. União players
Bundesliga players
2. Bundesliga players
MSV Duisburg players
Cypriot First Division players
Nea Salamis Famagusta FC players
Girabola players
F.C. Bravos do Maquis players
Argentine expatriate footballers
Expatriate footballers in Brazil
Expatriate footballers in Switzerland
Expatriate footballers in Portugal
Expatriate footballers in Germany
Expatriate footballers in Cyprus
Expatriate footballers in Angola
Argentine expatriate sportspeople in Brazil
Argentine expatriate sportspeople in Switzerland
Argentine expatriate sportspeople in Portugal
Argentine expatriate sportspeople in Germany
Argentine expatriate sportspeople in Cyprus
Argentine expatriate sportspeople in Angola
Sportspeople from Misiones Province